Eucalyptus petiolaris, commonly known as Eyre Peninsula blue gum, water gum or blue gum,  is a species of small to medium-sized tree that is endemic to South Australia. It is also naturalised in Western Australia. It has rough, flaky bark on the trunk, smooth greyish bark above, lance-shaped adult leaves, flower buds in groups of three, cream-coloured, yellow, pink or red flowers and cup-shaped or barrel-shaped fruit.

Description
It has rough, flaky bark on part or all of the trunk, smooth greyish and yellowish bark above. Flowering occurs from August to January and the flowers are cream-coloured to yellow or pink to brilliant red.

Taxonomy
Eyre Peninsula blue gum was first formally described in 1979 by Douglas John Boland who gave it the name Eucalyptus leucoxylon subsp. petiolaris. The description was published in Australian Forest Research from material he collected near Pillaworta Creek in 1971. In 1992, Kevin James Rule raised the subspecies to species status as E. petiolaris. The specific epithet (petiolaris) is from Latin, meaning "having a petiole".

Distribution and habitat
Eucalyptus petiolaris grows in remnants on farms, roadsides and a few flora reserves in hilly or undulating terrain near Port Lincoln and near Cleve. It has also been naturalised in a few coastal area in Western Australia.

See also
List of Eucalyptus species

References

Trees of Australia
petiolaris
Myrtales of Australia
Flora of South Australia
Plants described in 1979